The 2021 Call 811 Before You Dig 200 was a NASCAR Xfinity Series race held on March 13, 2021. It was contested over 200 laps on the  oval. It was the fifth race of the 2021 NASCAR Xfinity Series season. Team Penske driver Austin Cindric, collected his second win of the season.

Report

Background
The motorsport track opened in 1964 and currently hosts two NASCAR race weekends annually. PIR has also hosted the IndyCar Series, CART, USAC and the Rolex Sports Car Series. The raceway is currently owned and operated by International Speedway Corporation.

Entry list 

 (R) denotes rookie driver.
 (i) denotes driver who is ineligible for series driver points.

Qualifying
Daniel Hemric was awarded the pole for the race as determined by competition-based formula. Jordan Anderson, Dillon Bassett, and Andy Lally did not have enough points to qualify for the race.

Starting Lineups

Race

Race results

Stage Results 
Stage One
Laps: 45

Stage Two
Laps: 45

Final Stage Results 

Laps: 65

Race statistics 

 Lead changes: 10 among 6 different drivers
 Cautions/Laps: 11 for 65
 Time of race: 2 hours, 25 minutes, and 37 seconds
 Average speed:

References 

NASCAR races at Phoenix Raceway
2021 in sports in Arizona
Call 811 Before You Dig 200
2021 NASCAR Xfinity Series